François-Vincent Raspail (1794–1878) was a French politician and chemist.

Raspail may also refer to:

 Boulevard Raspail, a boulevard of Paris, France
 Raspail (Paris Métro), a station of the Paris Métro

People with the surname
 Benjamin Raspail (1823–1899), French politician, son of François-Vincent Raspail
 Jean Raspail (1925–2020), French writer

Occitan-language surnames